The 1999 UK & Ireland Greyhound Racing Year was the 73rd year of greyhound racing in the United Kingdom and Ireland.

Roll of honour

Summary
The National Greyhound Racing Club (NGRC) released the annual returns, with totalisator turnover at £80,268,946 and attendances recorded at 3,511,847. 

Chart King was voted Greyhound of the Year after winning the 1999 Scottish Greyhound Derby and 1999 English Greyhound Derby. He also picked up the Irish Greyhound of the Year award. Chart King a brindle dog was owned and trained by brothers Karl and Ralph Hewitt from Lurgan in Northern Ireland. He also won the Easter Cup in a record-breaking 28.40 at Shelbourne Park.

Linda Mullins won the Greyhound Trainer of the Year for the fourth successive year. 

Sky Sports increased their TV coverage to show major events on Tuesday nights at Wimbledon including the Springbok and the Grand National, the latter now held at Wimbledon instead of Hall Green. They also wanted to show the Pall Mall Stakes at Oxford but the track was reluctant to switch the event to a Tuesday night so remained off the viewing schedule for the time being.

Tracks
Wisbech reopened under NGRC rules and appointed former Peterborough RM Mike Middle. The tracks owner Gary Meads had improved the facilities after the venue had been closed for seven years. Canterbury closed its doors on 30 October and independent Workington ceased racing. Peterborough was severely damaged by fire spread from an adjoining warehouse. Work started immediately on repairs and refurbishment but there was no racing for six months. 

The Dundalk Race Company PLC and Dundealgan Greyhound Racing Company Limited merged to form Dundalk Racing (1999) Ltd. The Dundalk Ramparts Greyhound Stadium was earmarked for a major rebuild.

News
Elsewhere the BS Group (owners of several tracks) purchased the Milton Keynes Bowl to add to their assets. Shelley Cobbold sent out the last runner from the Utopia kennels at Nottingham, the family association with greyhound racing (Joe Cobbold, the late Trevor Cobbold and Pam Cobbold) ended. In November Linda Jones gained a contract at the country's premier track Walthamstow.

Competitions
El Tenor dropped back down in distance in an attempt to defend his Grand National title and made the final but was unlucky to find trouble when going well. The race ended in a dead heat for Hello Buttons and Pottos Storm. Despite this defeat the target of 100 open race wins was in sight even though he had gone past five years of age. By the end of the year he was still competing and winning.  

A puppy by the name of Rapid Ranger had started his career with defeat in two graded races at Stainforth for trainer Mike Pomfrett, but was improving and scored a first open win at Nottingham. By autumn he would improve and owner Ray White purchased the brindle and sent him to Charlie Lister.  

A brindle dog called Palace Issue, trained by Linda Mullins started to perform superbly and quickly established himself as the leading stayer. He broke the track record at Romford during the Champion Stakes before winning the Group One Grand Prix at Walthamstow that included his rival Dilemmas Lad. A strong fancy for the first St Leger at Wimbledon, he had to settle for second behind Dilemmas Lad before successfully defending his Hunt Cup title at Reading.  

Gerald Watson travelled to England with his 1999 Irish Greyhound Derby champion Spring Time and outclassed her rivals when winning the Oaks at Wimbledon and Bubbly Prince won the Cesarewitch at Catford Stadium for the Bubbly Club making up for the previous year's disappointment.

Principal UK races

dh=dead heat

Principal Irish finals

Totalisator returns

The totalisator returns declared to the National Greyhound Racing Club for the year 1999 are listed below.

References 

Greyhound racing in the United Kingdom
Greyhound racing in the Republic of Ireland
UK and Ireland Greyhound Racing Year
UK and Ireland Greyhound Racing Year
UK and Ireland Greyhound Racing Year
UK and Ireland Greyhound Racing Year